The following is a list of characters that first appeared in the British soap opera Emmerdale Farm in 1982, by order of first appearance.

Alan Turner

Samuel Skilbeck

Samuel David Skilbeck (known as Sam) is the son of Matt and Dolly Skilbeck. He appeared from 1982 to 1991.

Samuel is born in December 1982 and is named after Sam Pearson, the grandfather of Matt's first wife, Peggy Skilbeck. Matt and Peggy had a son Sam Skilbeck who died young. The original idea was to call the child David Samuel, but after a misunderstanding, the name is altered to Samuel Benjamin. Matt and Dolly separated in 1989, and Dolly and Sam left the village in 1991. The following year, Dolly remarried Matt.

1982
, Emmerdale